François Ngeze (born 1953) is a Burundian retired politician. He served as the acting head of state of Burundi from 21 October 1993 to 27 October 1993. He was chosen by the military Committee of Public Salvation, a group of army officers that staged the 1993 Burundian coup d'état attempt overthrew the democratically elected government of president Melchior Ndadaye (who was killed during the coup attempt).

Ngeze, one of the few prominent Hutu members of UPRONA (Union for National Progress) at the time, was interior minister in the government of Pierre Buyoya, who was defeated by Ndadaye in elections held on 1 June 1993.

Following widespread condemnation of the coup, the Committee of Public Salvation was dissolved on 27 October. Sylvie Kinigi, prime minister in the Ndadaye government, took over as acting president.

Early life 
François Ngeze was born in 1953 in Isare commune, Rutegama colline, Ruanda-Urundi. Ethnically, he is Hutu. In May 1972 the Burundian regime engaged in anti-Hutu repression, including massive violence. Ngeze was student at the time in Burengo and was arrested by the authorities and imprisoned at Kayanza. By his own account government administrator Basile Gateretse—a friend of his father—released him from prison and hid him in his home for two weeks with his cousin, Cyprien Ntaryamira. Once the authorities became suspicious, Gateretse arranged for the two of them to flee across the Ruzizi River into Zaire. Ngeze then went to Rwanda. He earned a university degree in pedagogy and became a teacher at Saint Léon Minor Seminary of Kabgayi. He married and fathered six children.

Political career 
Ngeze returned to Burundi in 1982. He joined the Union for National Progress (UPRONA) and became permanent secretary of the party chapter in Bujumbura. He rose to become Governor of Cankuzo Province in 1989 and later Governor of Bujumbura Rural Province. On 4 April 1992 he was sworn-in with a new national cabinet as Minister of Interior, becoming the first Hutu to hold the post since two decades prior.

References

Works cited 
 

Living people
Hutu people
Union for National Progress politicians
Heads of state of Burundi
Interior ministers of Burundi
1947 births